Plaza Vieja may refer to:
Plaza Vieja, Havana, Cuba
Plaza Vieja, La Rioja, Argentina
Plaza Vieja (Villarrobledo), Spain